Nature Reviews Molecular Cell Biology is a monthly peer-reviewed review journal published by Nature Portfolio. It was established in October 2000 and covers all aspects of molecular and cell biology. The editor-in-chief is Kim Baumann.

According to the Journal Citation Reports, the journal has a 2021 impact factor of 113.915, ranking it 1st out of 194 journals in the category "Cell Biology".

References

External links
 

Nature Research academic journals
Publications established in 2000
Molecular and cellular biology journals
Monthly journals
English-language journals
Review journals